Morpho richardus, or Richard's morpho, is a Neotropical butterfly found only in Minas Gerais, Brazil.

Description
Male indefinite greenish, female of yellowish bronze green. Both above and beneath like a small M. hercules. Forewing with three rows of submarginal yellow dots. The patch before the apex of the cell broadly dull gold yellow, with scattered black scales. Discal area of the forewing yellowish. Distal margin rather narrow, brown black, base of both wings light green. Under surface: forewing with four small, elongate ocelli of about uniform size, with narrow black irises. Proximally to the ocelli there are three very large, triangular grey-yellow median spots. Underside of the hindwing predominantly red brown with violet sheen. Median band grey violet. Length of the forewing 58 mm.

Biology
The larva feeds on Abuta selloana.

References

Le Moult (E.) & Réal (P.), 1962-1963. Les Morpho d'Amérique du Sud et Centrale, Editions du cabinet entomologique E. Le Moult, Paris.

External links
"Morpho Fabricius, 1807" at Markku Savela's Lepidoptera and Some Other Life Forms
Butterflies of America Images of type and other specimens.

Morpho
Nymphalidae of South America
Fauna of Brazil
Butterflies described in 1898
Taxa named by Hans Fruhstorfer